Rudolph Cornelius Wiedoeft (January 3, 1893 – February 18, 1940) was an American saxophonist.

Biography
Born in Detroit, Michigan, the son of German immigrants, at a young age Wiedoeft started playing with his family orchestra, first using a violin, then a clarinet. He relocated to New York City and, after a series of successful clarinet recordings with his Frisco Jass Band, switched to saxophone, then still an unusual instrument. He became known as a virtuoso saxophonist during the 1910s, made more than 300 recordings for many different record companies, and did much to popularize the saxophone as an instrument in both the U.S. and overseas. His main instrument was the C melody saxophone, a variety which was immensely popular from the 1910s until about 1930. He also played and recorded sometimes using E-flat alto and B-flat soprano saxophones as well.

His style was noted for very rapid runs of well-articulated notes in between long legato phrases in a ragtime influenced style. The rapidly articulated notes were made possible by the advanced techniques of double-tonguing and triple-tonguing, similar to those used by brass (trumpet, trombone, etc.) players and flutists. He was also known for his style of vibrato, which was very wide during the later years of his playing. During his earlier years, Wiedoeft's use of vibrato was quite spare. Wiedoeft employed several other 'sound effects,' such as slap tonguing and "laughing" (altering/bending the pitch of the note) through his horn, and alongside his very distinguishable vibrato, became a part of his musical repertoire. While he incorporated some elements of early jazz into his playing, he remained stylistically a pre-jazz artist. Some of his original compositions were successes, notably Valse Erica, Valse Llewellyn, Saxema, Saxophobia, and Sax-o-Phun.

He remained a very popular entertainer into the 1920s and performed regularly by radio, but his style started to sound more and more dated to the public as his career continued into the 1930s. He worked for a while in Rudy Vallee's band, then for a while in France. From the mid-1930s on, he essentially stopped playing and was involved in several mining investments that were not successful.

Rudy and his wife Mary Wiedoeft had a difficult relationship partially due to difficulties of maintaining their rather flamboyant lifestyle and alcohol abuse. During 1937, he was nearly killed when he was stabbed by his wife. The couple reconciled, however, and during the same year, Rudy made his last radio performance.

He died in Flushing, New York, on February 18, 1940, from cirrhosis of the liver.

Legacy
Before 1920, the Holton Instrument Company adapted features from existing production model saxophones and marketed them as the "Rudy Wiedoeft Model". However, it is doubtful Wiedoeft actually performed with such instruments.

Several of Wiedoeft's siblings also became professional musicians, the most famous being West coast bandleader Herb Wiedoeft (1886–1928).

External links
 The Legacy of Rudy Wiedoeft
 Rudy Wiedoeft recordings at the Discography of American Historical Recordings.
 
 

1893 births
1940 deaths
Deaths from cirrhosis
American male saxophonists
American people of German descent
Vocalion Records artists
Musicians from Detroit
20th-century American saxophonists
20th-century American male musicians